Mua is a small town in the Hahake (eastern) district on the island of Tongatapu, and it was for centuries the ancient capital of the Tongan empire. It is divided in the villages Lapaha and Tatakamotonga, is close to Talasiu and famous for the ancient langi (royal burial tombs).

Geography
Mua is situated along the eastern side of the lagoon of Tongatapu. Except for a  zone along the shore which is low-lying mud (now largely landfilled with stones), the remainder of the village is on high-lying red volcanic soil of high fertility.

Lapaha is also the home of the Tu'itonga Empire.
Lapaha is also the first capital of Tonga before the Tu'i Kanokupolu move it to Nukualofa.

Demography

According to the 1996 census there were 3900 people living Mua, a number expected to rise to 4900 if confirmed by the November 2006 census.

Most people of Lapaha are Roman Catholic, while Tatakamotonga is largely Wesleyan, although both see an increasing number of Mormons. This has a historical reason: the last Tui Tonga was Roman Catholic and lived in Lapaha.

Tatakamotonga has a government primary school in the northwestern part of the village and a high school run by the Wesleyan church (Tapunisiliva, eastern branch of Tupou high school) in the north-east. Lapaha has a government primary school and a high school run by the Roman Catholic Church (Takuilau) at the eastern end of the village.

History
Mua was at one time the center of Lapita culture in Tonga (about 2,000 years ago) and later (twelfth to sixteenth century CE) the capital of the Tui Tonga Empire. After the disintegration of the empire it remained the capital of the Tui Tonga (Tonga kings), up to the nineteenth century, but was rather a spiritual centre and no longer a source of political power.

The Tui Tonga and his retinue stayed in Lapaha, his residence being Olotele and Ahofakasiu, while Takuilau was for his wives (not to be confused with the current high school of the same name but further to the east). Subchiefs and servants on the other hand lived in Tatakamotonga.

When, around 1470, the Tui Tonga line started to lose power to the Tui Haatakalaua, and another century later to the Tui Kanokupolu, chiefs belonging to these lines were not welcome in Mua, and had to stay on the low-lying coastal areas, separated from the 'real' chiefs (i.e. those belonging to the Tui Tonga) by the Hala Fonuamoa (dry land road). The former became known as the kauhalalalo (low road people) and the latter as the kauhalauta (inland road people), which nowadays are still two important moieties in Tonga.

Burial tombs
Whatever political power the Tui Tonga yielded to their rivals, they gained in spiritual power, and as a kind of high priest they were perhaps even more awesome than as kings. When a Tui Tonga died he was buried in one of the huge tomb hills, known as langi, of which there are still at least two dozen in Lapaha. The Tui Haatakalaua were also buried in such tombs, but they are called fale instead.

The langi are big, artificial hills surrounded by huge slabs of coral rock, usually in three or more tiered layers. These slabs were quarried from several places along the coast of Tongatapu or neighbouring minor islands. They were only to be dug out and then transported by boat to the building site. Nevertheless, the accuracy by which the slabs were cut to shape so that they fit along each other with barely any space to spare is remarkable.

One of the best-preserved langi is the Paepae-o-Telea, which is even more remarkable as the slabs along the corner really have an 'L' shape.

The story that the slabs were moved by magic means from Uvea to Tonga is just a myth. Uvea is volcanic and has not got the proper geology. This fact has always been known, as shown, for example by a stanza of the poem named Laveofo from around the 18th century by Tufui.

The last Tui Tonga, Laufiltonga was buried in langi Tuofefafa. His grave is still marked with a huge cross, as he died as Catholic.

The langi are still used nowadays as burial sites. When the Kalaniuvalu chief died in 1999  he was buried in the Paepae o Telea. When the Tui Pelehake chief, Uluvalu and his wife Kaimana died in 2006, they were buried in langi Nā Moala.

Also worthwhile visiting are the remaining groundworks of an old, deserted fort on the border of Talasiu and Lapaha.

List
According to the matāpule Makalangahiva (variations by other informants)
Langi Tuo teau
Langi Kātoa
Langi Fanakava ki langi
Langi Tuo fefafa
Langi Tau a tonga
Langi Malu a tonga
Langi Leka
Langi Sinai
Langi Taetaea
Langi Faapite
Langi Tōfā ua
Langi Nukulau uluaki
Langi Nukulau ua
Langi Foou
Langi Hahake
Langi o Luani
Langi Tauhala
Langi Paepae o Telea (or Paepae o Telea)
Langi Nā Moala
Langi Hēhēa
Langi Esi a e kona
Langi Malomaloaa
Langi Nakuli ki langi
Fale Loāmanu
Fale Fakauō
Fale Tui(nga)papai
Fale Pulemālō
Fale Tauhakeleva

Fāonelua
The nickname of Lapaha is Paki mo e toi (picked with sap), referring to the many sweet smelling flowers which were to be picked regularly to be made into kahoa, (flower garlands) for the lords. Likewise Tatakamotonga is also known as Kolokakala (fragrant town) and other variants of this name.

An important tree with beautiful red flowers grew (and still grows) on the coastal marshland. Its name is Fāonelua and it is a unique species of mangrove. Only the Tui Tonga was allowed to wear its flowers as a garland, and as such the name has become a symbol for his reign.

Notable people
 Ronald Fotofili, Olympic sprinter from Lapaha

References

External links
E.W. Gifford, Tongan placenames, BPB 111, 1923

Populated places in Tonga
History of Tonga
Capitals of former nations
Tongatapu